Sharm El Sheikh is an Israeli song that commemorates the capture of Sharm El Sheikh during the Six-Day War. The song was sung by Yoel Dan and written by Dan, Ran Eliran, and Amos Ettinger.

History
It was the Six-Day War of the Arabs against the Israelis in June 1967. The Israeli public feared a dramatic defeat. Ran Eliran volunteered at the start of the war to entertain the troops. On the road between one performance for the military to another in the Sinai Desert, the song Sharm El Sheikh was born.

Eliran earned a gold record. It was not only heard and enjoyed in Israel, but in the United States as well. It is a commonly used melody for the hymn "Adon Olam."

References

Israeli songs